The 2011 Aikido World Championships was held at the Brunel University in London, United Kingdom from 11 to 14 August.

Medal summary

Mixed events

Men's events

Women's events

Medal table

Participating nations
270 competitors from 12 nations compete.

 (1)
 (7)
 (1)
 (1)
 (3)
 (31)
 (3)
 (26)
 (15)
 (13)
 (159)
 (10)

References

External links 
Results

Aikido World Championships
Aikido World Championships
Aikido World Championships
Aikido World Championships
Shodokan Aikido
Brunel University London